Anthony Eugene Longmire (born August 12, 1968), is a former professional baseball player. He was an outfielder in Major League Baseball (MLB) from 1993 to 1995.  He played for the Philadelphia Phillies.

Biography
Longmire graduated from Dr. James J. Hogan High School. He was drafted by the Pittsburgh Pirates in the 8th round of the 1986 Major League Baseball Draft. He began his career with the Pittsburgh Pirates and was traded to the Philadelphia Phillies organization in 1990.

References

External links

1968 births
Living people
African-American baseball players
American expatriate baseball players in Mexico
Baseball players from California
Gulf Coast Pirates players
Harrisburg Senators players
Leones de Yucatán players
Macon Pirates players
Major League Baseball outfielders
Philadelphia Phillies players
Reading Phillies players
Salem Buccaneers players
Sportspeople from Vallejo, California
Scranton/Wilkes-Barre Red Barons players
Tri-City Posse players